Amruta Patil (born 19 April 1979) is an Indian graphic novel author and painter.

Career
Born in 1979, Patil spent her childhood in Goa. She has a BFA degree from Goa College of Art (1999), and Master of Fine Arts degree from Tufts University, School of the Museum of Fine Arts in Boston (2004). She worked as a copywriter at Enterprise Nexus (Mumbai) in 1999-2000. She was the co-founder and editor of the quarterly magazine, 'Mindfields' (2007-2012). She was awarded a TED Fellowship in 2009.

Her debut graphic novel, Kari, commissioned and published by VK Karthika at HarperCollins India, explored themes of sexuality, friendship and death; and heralded Patil as India's first female graphic novelist.

Her two subsequent graphic novels Adi Parva: Churning of the Ocean and Sauptik: Blood and Flowers make up the Parva duology which retells stories from the Mahabharata from the viewpoint of the narrators (sutradhar) Ganga and Ashwatthama respectively. Speaking about these two novels, she talks about her decision to choose the two above-mentioned narrators because of their peripheral role in traditional retellings of the lore. The importance of the sutradhar has been reiterated - as a "way of bringing the stories closer to the present."

Her work has been translated in French and Italian.

Her collaborative project with mythologist Devdutt Pattanaik - a graphic novel, Aranyaka: Book of the Forest - was published by Westland in October 2019.

She was a speaker at the Zee Jaipur Literature Festival in 2017.

She was awarded the Ministry of Women and Child Development's Nari Shakti Puraskar in March 2017 at the hands of the 13th President of India, Pranab Mukherjee.

After a decade-long association with "comic book capital" Angoulême (France) and La Maison des Auteurs, a juried residency for comic book auteurs, Patil relocated to India in 2019. Patil was married to French animator and software innovator Anaël Seghezzi from 2009-2019.

Graphic novels
 Kari (2008)
 Adi Parva: Churning of the Ocean (2012)
 Sauptik: Blood and Flowers (2016)
 Aranyaka: Book of the Forest (2019)

Awards
 Nari Shakti Puraskar (Ministry of Women and Child Development)

References 

Indian women novelists
1979 births
Indian women painters
Living people
Indian graphic novelists
Artists from Pune
Women artists from Maharashtra
Painters from Maharashtra
Novelists from Maharashtra
21st-century Indian novelists
21st-century Indian women artists
Indian female comics artists
21st-century Indian women writers
Female comics writers